Rohan Bopanna and Aisam-ul-Haq Qureshi were the defending champions, but were ineligible compete this year, due to the ATP rules.
Dustin Brown and Martin Emmrich won in the final 7–6(17), 0–6, [10–7], against Henri Kontinen and Jarkko Nieminen.

Seeds

Draw

Draw

External links
 Main Draw

IPP Open - Doubles
IPP Open